Baks is a settlement in the Skenderaj municipality in Kosovo. It lies 680–700 m over sea level. The village is exclusively inhabited by ethnic Albanians; in the 1991 census, it had 1044 inhabitants.

Geography
It lies in the hilly region of Drenica, on the western slopes of Çiçavica, six km southeast from Skenderaj.

History
The ethnic Albanian Kosovo Liberation Army (KLA) had by 1997 controlled large parts of the Drenica region to save the Albanian population from Serbian forces. The nearby.  village of Prekaz was the home to KLA leader Adem Jashari, who was killed together with most of his family in the Attack on Prekaz. During the Kosovo War, in late March 1999, Serb military forces undertook an offensive throughout Skenderaj. Villages were shelled and inhabitants of several villages, including Baks, fled to Çirez. Men from the village were captured and some were killed by Serb police during operations in Drenas and Skenderaj.  In 2017, Bekim Jashari built houses for financially weak people from Baks.

Economy
The village is primarily of livestock farming.

Notes

References

• Demographic development in Baks

Sources

Human Rights Watch Warcrimes in Kosovo
Geographic Baks

Villages in Skenderaj